The following is a list of fortified churches in Transylvania.  Southeastern Transylvania in Romania has one of the highest numbers of still-existing fortified churches, which were built during the 13th to 16th centuries, a period during which Transylvania was part of the Kingdom of Hungary and the Ottoman Empire was rising. More than 150 villages in the area count various types of fortified churches, seven of them being included in the UNESCO World Heritage under the name of Villages with fortified churches in Transylvania.

List of Saxon towns and villages 

The following is a list of Transylvanian Saxon towns and villages with a fortified church.

Agârbiciu  
Agnita  
Alma Vii 
Alțâna 
Amnaș 
Apold  
Archita 
Ațel  
Avrig
Axente Sever  
Băgaciu
Bărcuț 
Bazna 
Beia
Biertan 
Bod 
Boian
Bradu 
Brateiu
Brădeni
Bruiu  
Bunești  
Buzd  
Câlnic 
Cața
Cenade 
Chirpăr 
Cincșor 
Cincu 
Cisnădie (end of the 12th century)
Cisnădioara (2nd half of the 12th century)
Cloașterf 
Codlea 
Copșa Mare  
Cricău  
Cristian
Cristian (13th-15th centuries)
Criț  
Curciu 
Dacia  
Daia, Mureș  
Daia, Sibiu  
Daneș  
Dârlos  
Dealu Frumos
Dobârca
Drăușeni 
Dupuș  
Feldioara  
Felmer 
Fișer
Gherdeal  
Ghimbav  
Gușterița (now a district of Sibiu, 13th-15th centuries) 
Hamba (16th century)
Hălchiu, Brașov 
Hărman 
Hetiur  
Homorod 
Hosman 
Iacobeni, Sibiu  
Ighișu Nou  
Jimbor, Brașov  
Laslea  
Măieruș 
Mălâncrav  
Marpod  
Mediaș 
Mercheașa  
Merghindeal  
Meșendorf 
Metiș, Sibiu  
Micăsasa  
Miercurea Sibiului 
Moardăș 
Moșna 
Motiș, Sibiu  
Movile, Sibiu  
Netuș
Nocrich  
Noiștat  
Ocna Sibiului 
Orăștie (around 1400)
Ormenis, Brasov
Pelișor, Sibiu 
Prejmer 
Racoș
Râșnov
Richiș, Sibiu  
Roadeș  
Rodbav  
Roșia, Sibiu  
Rotbav  
Ruja  
Ruși  
Sânpetru  
Sântimbru
Saschiz 
Seliștat  
Slimnic  
Stejărișu  
Șaeș
Șard
Șaroș pe Târnave
Șeica Mare
Șeica Mică 
Șelimbăr (13th century)
Șoala  
Șoarș  
Șomartin  
Șura Mare (13th century)
Șura Mică (13th century)
Tălmaciu 
Țapu
Toarcla  
Turnișor (now a district of Sibiu, 12th-20th centuries)
Ungra  
Valchid  
Valea Viilor 
Velț
Veseud  
Viscri 
Vulcan, Brașov  
Vulcan, Mureș  
Vurpăr, Alba
Vurpăr, Sibiu

List of Székely towns and villages 

The following is a list of Székely towns and villages with a fortified church.

 Aita Mare
 Arcuș
 Armășeni
 Baraolt
 Biborțeni
 Bodoc
 Bicfalău
 Calnic
 Catalina
 Cârța
 Ciucsângeorgiu 
 Dârjiu
 Delnița
 Ghidfalău
 Ilieni
 Lăzarea 
 Leliceni
 Misentea
 Racu
 Sânzieni
 Sfântu Gheorghe  
 Turia
 Zăbala

Additional examples

See also 
 List of castles in Romania

References

External links 

  Fortified churches from Transylvania

Medieval Transylvania
 Transylvania
Tourism in Romania
Churches in Transylvania
Transylvanian fortified churches
churches